The Graveyard and the Ballroom is the debut album by English band A Certain Ratio, released in January 1980 by record label Factory. It was produced by Martin Hannett. It was originally released only as a cassette, designed by Peter Saville. The album has been re-released on CD by Creation Records in 1994 and by Mute Records in 2017. The latter also reissued the album on vinyl, replicating the original PVC pouch of the cassette release.

The reissued album spent five weeks in the UK Independent Chart, peaking at number 29.

Content 

Side A of the album, The Graveyard, was recorded at Graveyard Studios in September 1979, while the other side, The Ballroom, was recorded live at the Electric Ballroom in October.

Critical reception
AllMusic described the album as "accomplished enough to be intriguing, but never all that gripping." Trouser Press called it "an exciting and original post-punk dance record". Stylus called it "not only a very interesting historical document but also a pretty entertaining album in its own right".

Track listing

The Graveyard
 "Do the Du (Casse)" - 2:53
 "Faceless" - 2:22
 "Crippled Child" - 2:54
 "Choir" - 3:21
 "Flight" - 3:30
 "I Fail" - 2:12
 "Strain" - 2:31

The Ballroom
 "All Night Party" - 3:38
 "Oceans" - 4:05
 "The Choir" - 3:22
 "The Fox" - 3:25
 "Suspect" - 2:24
 "Flight" - 5:32
 "Genotype-Phenotype" - 3:29

References

External links 

 

1980 debut albums
A Certain Ratio albums
Albums produced by Martin Hannett
Dance-punk albums
Factory Records albums
Factory Records live albums